John Flavel was an English Presbyterian.

John Flavel may also refer to:

John Flavel (logician) (1596–1617)

See also
John H. Flavell, psychologist